TV Globo (formerly Rede Globo; Globo Network), or simply Globo, is a Brazilian television network, launched by media mogul Roberto Marinho on April 26, 1965. It is owned by media conglomerate Grupo Globo, being by far the largest of its holdings. Globo is the second-largest commercial TV network in annual revenue worldwide behind just American Broadcasting Company and the largest producer of telenovelas.

Globo launches its own schedule of shows and programs annually, and launches new seasons of pilots, something only seen in Globo itself, compared with the other major television channels in Brazil (SBT, Record, Band, RedeTV!). They convey the American TV shows (SBT, Band and Record) and/or religious programs (Band and RedeTV!).

Globo has output deals with Walt Disney Pictures, 20th Century Studios, Marvel Studios, DreamWorks Animation, Paramount Pictures, Sony Pictures Entertainment, and more, having one of the largest film libraries for being shown on a TV network. , they started to broadcast films from Warner Bros. Entertainment.

Globo is still today the highest rating television network among viewers of all ages and has the highest advertising turnout among the national TV networks.

Current programs

Telenovelas
Current 

Reruns

TV series

Reality shows

Late night

Variety, game shows and talk shows

Educational, Environmental and Social service

News and information

Sports

Programming

Coverage

Football

Carnival

Movie blocks
 Cinema Especial (1978–present)
 Corujão (1985–present)
 Domingo Maior (1972–present)
 Campeões de Bilheteria (1969-1998; 2020-present)
 Cinemaço (2019–present)
 Sessão da Tarde (1974–present)
 Supercine (1981–present)
 Tela Quente (1988–present)
 Temperatura Máxima (1989–present)
 Sessão de Sábado (1992-2011; 2019 and 2020 as an exceptional basis; 2021 - as a summer special and permanently since September)

International series
 S.W.A.T. (2020–present)
 The Good Doctor (2019–present)
 This Is Us (2022–present)

Upcoming programming

Telenovelas Cartoons and TV Series
Fim by Fernanda Torres and Marcela Camargo (Globoplay; mid 2022)
Mal Secreto by Bráulio Mantovani (Globoplay; mid 2022)
O Jogo que Mudou a História by José Junior (Globoplay; mid 2022)
Paraíso Perdido by George Moura and Sérgio Goldenberg (Globoplay; mid 2022)
Dragon by Tiago Rezende and Jorge Furtado (Globoplay; mid 2022)
 Olho por Olho by João Emanuel Carneiro (9pm; mid 2022)
 Travessia by Glória Perez (9pm; mid 2023)
 Bom Dia, Muchachos! by Daniel Ortiz (7pm; mid 2022)

 Sorte na Vida by Ricardo Linhares and Maria Helena Nascimento
 Arroz de Palma by Bruno Luperi (6pm; mid 2023)
 Untitled Walcyr Carrasco telenovela by Walcyr Carrasco (9pm; mid 2023)

Gloob
 Valerosas (5pm; mid 2025)

Gloobinho
 Historias a casa do abrol (Seasons 3-4) (10pm; mid 2023)
 The Kiddie Ride Show (O Show do Kiddie Ride) (6pm: mid 2024)

Globosat
Multishow 
 Kukori es Kotda (12pm; mid 2025)
Rede Telecine Premium, Fun and Cult
 The Super Mario Movie (6am; mid 2024)
 The Momaship Movie (11pm: mid 2027)
SporTV (Brazil)
 Ecosport by Natalia Perda (7pm; Mid 2025)
Globo News 
 Jornal da Globo News Curta edicao'' 9pm mid 2024

Events
93rd Academy Awards
Rock in Rio 2021
Lollapalooza Brasil 2021

Sports
 2020 Copa América
 UEFA Euro 2020
 2021 Summer Olympics
 2021 FIFA Confederations Cup
 2022 Winter Olympics
 2022 FIFA World Cup

See also
 List of former programs broadcast on TV Globo

References

External links 
 
 

Rede Globo